Founded in 2004, the Toowoomba Fillies Women's Rugby League Club, commonly referred to as Toowoomba Fillies, are an Australian professional women's rugby league football team based in Toowoomba, a city in South East Queensland west of Queensland's capital city, Brisbane. Toowoomba Fillies have affiliations with the Toowoomba Clydesdales and Queensland Rugby League South West Division they play in the Brisbane and District Women's Rugby League.

See also

References

External links

Women's rugby league teams in Australia
Rugby league teams in Queensland
Sport in Toowoomba
Rugby clubs established in 2004
2004 establishments in Australia
Toowoomba Clydesdales